The 1970 Greenville 200 was a NASCAR Grand National Series event that was held on June 27, 1970, at Greenville-Pickens Speedway in Greenville, South Carolina.

Race report
Seven thousand racing fans were in attendance to see Bobby Isaac defeat Bobby Allison by ½ of a lap. Bobby Allison had to borrow his son Davey's car because he wrecked his car during the previous week. It took one hour and thirty-three seconds for the race to reach its conclusion. All twenty-nine competitors were born in the United States of America with no foreign-born drivers, unlike today. Five notable crew chiefs were recorded as participating in the event; including Lee Gordon, Dale Inman and Harry Hyde.

Carburetors were still in wide use in both passenger automobiles and with the NASCAR vehicles during the early 1970s; requiring plenty of physically-intensive labor from the people who would maintain the vehicles between races.

Notable drivers in the field included: Richard Petty, Benny Parsons, Elmo Langley (died of a heart attack after driving the pace car at an exhibition race in Japan), Roy Tyner (murdered in his vehicle), and J.D. McDuffie (killed after colliding with turn 5 at the 1991 Budweiser At The Glen race at Watkins Glen International). The winner's purse was considered to be $1,500 ($ when adjusted for inflation).

The race car drivers still had to commute to the races using the same stock cars that competed in a typical weekend's race through a policy of homologation (and under their own power). This policy was in effect until roughly 1975. By 1980, NASCAR had completely stopped tracking the year model of all the vehicles and most teams did not take stock cars to the track under their own power anymore.

Qualifying

Finishing order
Section reference: 

 Bobby Isaac† (No. 71)
 Bobby Allison (No. 22)
 Dick Brooks† (No. 32)
 James Hylton (No. 48)
 Benny Parsons† (No. 72)
 Elmo Langley† (No. 64)
 Jabe Thomas† (No. 25)
 Bill Champion† (No. 10)
 Ed Negre (No. 8)
 Ken Meisenhelder (No. 04)
 Wendell Scott† (No. 34)
 J.D. McDuffie† (No.70)
 Ben Arnold (No. 76)
 Neil Castles* (No. 06)
 Bill Seifert (No. 45)
 Lee Gordon (No. 97)
 Johnny Halford* (No. 57)
 Roy Tyner† (No. 92)
 Richard Petty* (No. 43)
 Dave Marcis (No. 30)
 Raymond Williams* (No. 47)
 Frank Warren* (No. 79)
 Henley Gray* (No. 19)
 John Sears*† (No. 4)
 Earl Brooks* (No. 26)
 Cecil Gordon*† (No. 24)
 Pete Hazelwood* (No. 12)
 Bill Shirey* (No. 74)
 John Jennings* (No. 82)

† signifies that the driver is known to be deceased 
* Driver failed to finish race

Timeline
Section reference: 
 Start of race: Bobby Isaac started the race with the pole position.
 Lap 3: John Jennings managed to overheat his vehicle.
 Lap 10: Bill Shirey managed to overheat his vehicle.
 Lap 23: Oil pressure issues managed to put Pete Hazelwood out to pasture for the day.
 Lap 34: Transmission issues forced Cecil Gordon to quit racing for the rest of the day.
 Lap 37: Earl Brooks managed to abuse his brakes, forcing him to exit the race too soon.
 Lap 40: Steering issues got the best of John Sears.
 Lap 46: Henley Gray managed to overheat his vehicle.
 Lap 63: Raymond Williams managed to overheat his vehicle; Frank Warren managed to lose the rear end of his vehicle.
 Lap 124: Richard Petty takes over the lead from Bobby Isaac.
 Lap 125: Bobby Allison takes over the lead from Richard Petty.
 Lap 134: Bobby Isaac takes over the lead from Bobby Allison.
 Lap 137: Richard Petty had a terminal crash, causing him not to finish the race.
 Lap 163: Johnny Halford developed problems with his oil pressure, forcing him out of the race.
 Lap 175: The rear end of Neil Castles' vehicle fell off, ending his day on the track.
 Finish: Bobby Isaac was officially declared the winner of the event.

References

Greenville 200
Greenville 200
NASCAR races at Greenville-Pickens Speedway